Asim Sarajlić (born 3 October 1975) is a Bosnian politician who was a member of the national House of Peoples from 2019 to 2023. He is a member of the Party of Democratic Action as well.

Previously, Sarajlić was a member of the national House of Representatives from 2010 to 2018. From 2004 until 2010, he served as the municipal mayor of Vogošća.

Biography
Born in Vogošća in 1975, Sarajlić holds a degree from the Faculty of Political Science at the University of Sarajevo. In April 1992, he joined the Army of the Republic of Bosnia and Herzegovina as a juvenile and was wounded twice in the Bosnian War. He is married to Emina Sarajlić and they have two children.

Sarajlić served as mayor of the municipality of Vogošća from 2 October 2004 until 10 November 2010. 

At the 2010 election Sarajlić was elected to the national House of Representatives for the SDA party, and re-elected in 2014. After the 2018 election, in February 2019, Sarajlić was appointed to the national House of Peoples. He served as member of the House of Peoples until February 2023.

Sarajlić was also a member of the presidency and Vice-president of the Party of Democratic Action until 3 March 2020, after which he resigned from both positions because of a political scandal. 

In April 2022, Sarajlić was added to the US Treasury's Specially Designated Nationals and Blocked Persons List of individuals whose assets are blocked and U.S. persons are generally prohibited from dealing with them. Sarajlić was designated under Executive Order 14033, which targets persons who threaten the stability of the Western Balkans region through corruption, criminal activity, and other destabilizing behavior. According to the designation,
"Asim Sarajlić is a member of the parliament of Bosnia and Herzegovina and was until recently a high-ranking Party of Democratic Action (SDA) official. Sarajlić is the infamous subject of the “Asim affair,” a political corruption scandal in which Sarajlić was caught promising to secure a job for the wife of a party delegate in exchange for a requested vote on a political party position. Sarajlić has been indicted for additional offenses, including abuse of office and influence peddling.

Sarajlić has also abused his position in relation to BH Telecom, a large state-owned enterprise. In this capacity, Sarajlić personally accepted payment from job applicants in exchange for positions, and otherwise exerted inordinate influence over the hiring process. As part of this activity, Sarajlić recommended candidates who were reportedly severely underqualified, undermining the integrity of the company.

Sarajlić was designated pursuant to E.O. 14033 for being responsible for or complicit in, or for having directly or indirectly engaged in, corruption related to the Western Balkans, including corruption by, on behalf of, or otherwise related to a government in the Western Balkans, or a current or former government official at any level of government in the Western Balkans, such as the misappropriation of public assets, expropriation of private assets for personal gain or political purposes, or bribery."

References

External links
Asim Sarajlić at parlament.ba

1975 births
Living people
People from Vogošća
Army of the Republic of Bosnia and Herzegovina soldiers
Party of Democratic Action politicians
Members of the House of Representatives (Bosnia and Herzegovina)
Members of the House of Peoples of Bosnia and Herzegovina